Rufina is a comune (municipality) in the Metropolitan City of Florence in the Italian region Tuscany, located about  east of Florence.

Rufina borders the following municipalities: Dicomano, Londa, Montemignaio, Pelago, Pontassieve, Pratovecchio.

Main sights 

Church of Santo Stefano, at Castiglioni, an architectural complex formed of several buildings including a church and belltower. The interior of the church is divided into a nave and two aisles covered with a trussed ceiling.
Church of Santa Maria at Falgano
Pieve of San Bartolomeo at Pomino
Church of Santa Maria del Carmine ai Fossi
Villa di Poggio Reale, a 16th-century residence which now hosts events and conferences. A cypress-lined boulevard leads up to the facade of Villa Poggio Reale where   Leopold II, Grand Duke of Tuscany stayed in 1829.

References

External links

 Official website